9 Pegasi (9 Peg) is a supergiant star in the constellation Pegasus. Its apparent magnitude is 4.35.

9 Pegasi is defined and used as an MK standard star for the spectral type G5 Ib. It is a yellow supergiant nearly two thousand times more luminous than the sun and sixty times larger. It has been reported to be slightly variable and is listed in the New Catalogue of Suspected Variable Stars with a magnitude range of 4.20 to 4.35.

9 Pegasi does not have a Bayer designation although it is brighter than several stars in Pegasus that do such as τ, φ, and σ Pegasi.  It is the 9th star numbered by Flamsteed in order of right ascension.  In the 1795 French-language Fortin-Flamsteed edition of the Atlas Coelestis, 9 Pegasi is labelled with the letter "g".

References

Pegasus (constellation)
G-type supergiants
Suspected variables
Pegasi, 09
8313
206859
107348
BD+16 4582